The short-billed leaftosser (Sclerurus rufigularis) is a species of bird in the family Furnariidae. It is found in Bolivia, Brazil, Colombia, Ecuador, French Guiana, Guyana, Peru, Suriname, and Venezuela. Its natural habitat is subtropical or tropical moist lowland forests.

Description
The short-billed leaftosser is a stocky bird with a short tail. Otherwise, it is similar in appearance to the tawny-throated leaftosser (Sclerurus mexicanus) being dark brown with a buffy-ochre throat and rufous breast. It may have a faint reddish-brown eye-stripe and pale brown eye-ring.

Distribution
This funarid has a widespread distribution in the northern Amazon rainforest.

Ecology
Leaftossers are secretive birds that move through the undergrowth probing the leaf-litter with their beaks. They are difficult to observe, but may be recognised by the calls they emit, particularly at dawn and dusk. Short-billed leaftossers feed on the ground, hopping rather than walking, probing moist soil and rotten wood with their beaks and flicking aside dead leaves while foraging for small invertebrates. Their diet includes spiders, insect egg cases, ants, beetle larvae and adult beetles.

Status
Compared to similar-sized ground-dwelling, birds, S. rufigularis is intolerant of fragmentation of its forest habitat and does not persist in isolated remnants of forest. This may be because of its inability to cross open ground and thus it is unable to disperse or recolonise forest fragments, or it may be due to a failure to adapt to the forest-edge changes in its habitat. However, even if the number of birds is declining somewhat, the bird has a very extensive range and a presumed large total population, and the International Union for Conservation of Nature has assessed its conservation status as being of "least concern".

References

External links

short-billed leaftosser
Birds of the Amazon Basin
Birds of the Guianas
short-billed leaftosser
Birds of Brazil
Taxonomy articles created by Polbot